Melaleuca psammophila is a plant in the myrtle family, Myrtaceae, and is endemic to the south-west of Western Australia. It is a small shrub with narrow leaves, heads of purple, pink or mauve flowers and clusters of woody fruit. It is similar to M. bisulcata but differs from that species in characters such as the shape of its fruit, leaves and buds but like that species is an attractive, profusely flowering shrub suitable for cultivation as a garden plant.

Description
Its branchlets are covered with woolly hairs which are gradually lost as the branches mature. Its leaves are sparsely covered with shorter hairs and are arranged alternately on the stems.

The flowers are mostly arranged in heads on the ends of branches which continue to grow after flowering. The stamens give the flower heads their pinkish colour with each stamen tipped with a contrasting yellow anther. The stamens are arranged in five bundles around the flowers, each bundle containing between 7 and 15 stamens.

Taxonomy and naming
Melaleuca psammophila was first described in 1904 by Ludwig Diels and Ernst Georg Pritzel in Botanische jahrbucher fur systematik, pflanzengeschichte und pflanzengeographie under the heading Fragmenta Phytographiae Australiae occidentalis:Beitrage zur Kenntnis der Pflanzen Westaustraliens, ihrer Verbreitung und ihrer Lebensverhaltnisse ("Contributions to the knowledge of the plants of West Australia, where they are found and their conditions of existence"). The specific epithet (psammophila) is from the Ancient Greek ψάμμος (psámmos), meaning “sand” and φίλος (phílos), meaning “dear one" or "friend” referring to this species' preference for growing in sand.

Distribution and habitat
Melaleuca psammophila occurs in and between the Nerren Nerren, Kalbarri and Geraldton districts in the Geraldton Sandplains and Yalgoo biogeographic regions growing in sand on sandplains.

Conservation
This species is classified as "not threatened" by the Government of Western Australia Department of Parks and Wildlife.

Use in horticulture
This species has been successfully grown in the southern parts of Australia in sunny positions in light, well-drained soils.

References

psammophila
Myrtales of Australia
Plants described in 1904
Endemic flora of Western Australia
Taxa named by Ludwig Diels